Wildside is an Australian crime drama television series broadcast by the Australian Broadcasting Corporation from 1997 to 1999. It was created by director Michael Jenkins and producer Ben Gannon.

Wildside began as a 180-minute miniseries which aired over two nights on November 23, 1997 and November 24, 1997. It returned on February 4, 1998 in a one-hour format.

The show stars Tony Martin as Bill McCoy, a former detective who comes to Sydney looking for his missing son. Unlike other police procedurals, it also follows the staff of a crisis centre, run by Dr. Maxine Summers (Rachael Blake), in the gritty, red-light district of the city.

The series was filmed in Darlinghurst, Sydney and was characterised by its use of ad lib dialogue and hand held camera work. The show was critically acclaimed, winning several Logie Awards, including Most Outstanding Miniseries Logie in 1998, and Silver Logies for outstanding work by Tony Martin and Rachael Blake in 1999, as well as several Australian Film Institute Awards.

Cast

Starring
The following appear in the opening credits as series regulars:
Tony Martin as Bill McCoy, a former detective searching for his missing son who is persuaded to rejoin the police
Rachael Blake as Dr. Maxine Summers, a doctor who runs a community crisis centre
Aaron Pedersen as Vince Cellini, an Italian-Australian lawyer at the crisis centre who later discovers his Aboriginal heritage (miniseries, 1.01–2.10)
Jessica Napier as Gerry Davis, the receptionist at the crisis centre and a former street kid and sex worker herself (miniseries, 1.01–1.36)
Alex Dimitriades as Detective Charlie Coustos, McCoy's partner (2.01–2.20, also starring in 1.09–1.36)
Abi Tucker as Detective Kate Holbeck, colleague of McCoy and Coustos (2.11–2.20, also starring in 2.01–2.10)

Also starring
The following recurring cast members are credited at the end of every episode in which they appear, before the preview of next week's episode and separated from the other guest actors.
John Howard as Detective Frank Reilly, McCoy's corrupt former partner (miniseries, 1.01)
Victoria Longley as Inspector Virginia King
Tammy MacIntosh as Detective Kim Devlin, Reilly's partner, becomes McCoy's partner (miniseries, 1.01–1.08)
Richard Carter as Detective Brian Deakin, colleague of McCoy and Coustos
John O'Hare as Rob Summers, Maxine's husband, they later divorce (miniseries, 1.01–1.08)
Abbie Cornish as Simone Summers, Maxine's daughter
Jim Holt as Sergeant Graham Holbeck, Kate's father (1.26–2.16)
 Mitchell McMahon as Nick McCoy, Bill's son (miniseries, 1.39–2.04)
Mary Coustas as Louise Arden, Vince Cellini's replacement as the crisis centre's resident lawyer (2.11–2.20)

Former police detective John Haas acts as the show's police adviser and appears in the background of nearly every episode as Detective Mark Doyle, a colleague of McCoy and Deakin.

Martin and Blake were the only actors to appear in every episode. They began an off screen relationship during the show's run and married in 2003.

Production and broadcast
Wildside was created by Michael Jenkins and Ben Gannon and originally produced as a miniseries. It was first broadcast on  November 23, 1997 and November 24, 1997. A further 36 episodes were broadcast between February and September 1998. After the first series, Jessica Napier was written off the show, with the writers admitting they found it difficult to find storylines for her character.

A second series of 20 episodes was broadcast between February and July 1999. The show was cancelled in December 1998 due to high production costs and the difficulty in selling the show overseas.

In repeats and syndication, the miniseries was edited into the first four episodes of the 40-episode first series.

The style of production was very similar to Jenkins' earlier series Scales of Justice and Blue Murder, particularly the  "observational" use of multiple hand-held cameras and the density of semi-improvised dialogue. Many of the cast had previously worked with Jenkins and Gannon in Blue Murder and Heartbreak High, including regulars Tony Martin, Alex Dimitriades and Abi Tucker, and guest stars Hugh Baldwin, Scott Major, Mario Gamma, Jon Pollard, Sebastian Goldspink, Doris Younane, Emma Roche, Salvatore Coco, Tara Jakszewicz, Inge Hornstra, Diane Craig, Vince Poletto, Tai Nguyen and Nina Liu. Nico Lathouris acts as the show's dramaturg and acting coach, continuing his long collaboration with Jenkins and Gannon.

Controversy
Several episodes of the show were based on real life crimes and events, which led to some controversy. The thirteenth episode of the first series, which aired on April 22, 1998 and involved the stabbing of a cab driver, did not initially air in New South Wales, due to a court case that was proceeding at the time. Another episode, which aired on May 6, 1998, was based on a real life incident in which a Muslim boy was run down by a car. It aired with a disclaimer: "The story of the injured boy depicted in the following episode of Wildside is inspired by real events. However, the action of some characters has been significantly altered for dramatic purposes."

An episode which featured a far right female politician resembling Pauline Hanson was pulled by ABC in June 1998, claiming it was "inappropriate" to air on the eve of the Queensland election. Aaron Pederson quit the show in protest, before being convinced to return by the show's producers. The episode aired the following week.

Episodes

Miniseries (1997)

Series 1 (1998)

Series 2 (1999)

DVD release
The series was released by the ABC on DVD in three volumes, each containing 20 episodes across 5 discs.

Awards and nominations

See also
 List of Australian television series

References

External links

 Australian Television: Wildside
Wildside at the National Film and Sound Archive
Wildside – Episode 1 at Australian Screen Online

1997 Australian television series debuts
1999 Australian television series endings
1990s Australian crime television series
Australian Broadcasting Corporation original programming
Television shows set in Sydney
English-language television shows
1990s Australian drama television series